NFPA 1006 (Standard on Operations and Training for Technical Search and Rescue Incidents) is a standard published by the National Fire Protection Association.

Purpose 
As per NFPA, this standard identifies the minimum job performance requirements (JPRs) for fire service and other emergency response personnel who perform technical rescue operations.

Revision history

References 

Fire protection
NFPA Standards
Rescue